Innovation Place is the registered business name of the Saskatchewan Opportunities Corporation (SOCO), a crown corporation in Saskatchewan. SOCO operates two research parks: one located near the University of Saskatchewan in Saskatoon, Saskatchewan, and the second near the University of Regina in Regina, Saskatchewan. In 2018, approximately 140 companies were based at Innovation Place. Research parks such as Innovation Place are sometimes referred to as science parks or technology parks.

Saskatoon
The Saskatoon park was established in 1980.

Innovation Place in Saskatoon consists of the following buildings:
 The Atrium
 Bio Processing Centre
 Canadian Space Agency building's large ground station
 The Concourse
 Dr. Burton Craig Building
 411 Downey Road
 Galleria Building
 L.F. Kristjanson Biotechnology Complex  (410 Downey Road)
 Maintenance/Energy Centre 
 National Hydrology Research Centre - Hydrology research and environmental monitoring facility run by Environment Canada
 108 Research Drive 
 110 Research Drive 
 112 Research Drive 
 121 Research Drive
 SaskTel Remote Switching Station 
 SED Systems

Regina

The  site is located near the University of Regina and was established in 2000.  This research park emphasizes collaborative university and industry research in the areas of information technology, petroleum, and environmental science.  Currently, over 850 people work for the various tenants of the research park.

The building houses ISM Information Systems Management Canada Corporation (subsidiary of  IBM Canada).
The building houses McNair Business Development Inc, TRLabs, SpringBoard West Innovations Inc., GB Internet Solutions, SRnet and the University of Regina. 
This houses the Saskatchewan Research Council, University of Regina. PTRC offices.
 Titanium Pilot Plant houses a pilot plant of Titanium Corporation Inc.
 Greenhouse Gas Technology Centre is near Innovation Place and operated by the University of Regina.  This  building houses the International Centre for CO2 Capture and includes a pilot plant.
Saskatchewan Disease Control Laboratory (5 Research Drive) opened in 2010.

Prince Albert
The Forest Centre in Prince Albert opened on September 27, 2005 and was originally managed by Innovation Place. On March 15, the University of Saskatchewan purchased the property to bring together the university's educational programming taking place across Prince Albert.

References

External links

 
 Saskatchewan Opportunities Corporation

 

Science parks in Canada
University of Saskatchewan
University of Regina
Buildings and structures in Regina, Saskatchewan
Buildings and structures in Saskatoon
Companies based in Saskatoon
Buildings and structures in Prince Albert, Saskatchewan